The Legislature of Yukon is the legislature of the territory of Yukon, Canada. The legislature is made of two elements: the Commissioner of Yukon, who represents the federal government of Canada, and the unicameral assembly Yukon Legislative Assembly. The legislature has existed since Yukon was formed out of part of the Northwest Territories in 1898.

Like the Canadian federal government, Yukon uses a Westminster-style parliamentary government, in which members are sent to the Legislative Assembly after general elections and from there the party with the most seats chooses a Premier of Yukon and Executive Council of Yukon.  The premier acts as Yukon's head of government. Being creatures of the federal government, Canadian territories do not have heads of state, but the role of the Commissioner is somewhat analogous to the role of a provincial lieutenant governor.

Before the Legislative Assembly was created in 1978, the territory's legislative assembly was the Yukon Territorial Council. This council was unelected from 1898 until 1909.